Herbert König (1820, Dresden - 13 June 1876, Radebeul) was a German graphic artist, illustrator and watercolorist.

Life and work
After he had completed his training at the Dresden Academy of Fine Arts, he joined a theater company, where he tried his hand at acting and directing. During the German Revolution, he gave up the stage and settled in Munich; working as a draftsman and caricaturist.

He eventually earned his living with humorous and satirical sketches for several newspapers and magazines; notably the Fliegende Blätter.

His frequent study trips took him to Austria, Hungary, Belgium and the Netherlands. In 1852, he accepted an offer in Leipzig; becoming a staff illustrator for Die Gartenlaube and the Illustrirte Zeitung. He later moved to Berlin, where he stayed for five years, creating portraits of notable people; primarily actors and other entertainers.

He died there in 1876, after becoming ill during a trip to Italy.

His book illustrations include those for Fritz Wildhaus Abenteuer zu Wasser und zu Lande (Fritz Waldhaus' Adventures on Sea and Land) by Friedrich Gerstäcker; published posthumously.

References

Further reading 
 Frank Andert (Ed.): Stadtlexikon Radebeul. Historisches Handbuch für die Lößnitz. Herausgegeben vom Stadtarchiv Radebeul. 2nd edition, Stadtarchiv, Radebeul 2006,

External links 

 Herbert König @ German WikiSource

1820 births
1876 deaths
German illustrators
German watercolourists
Dresden Academy of Fine Arts
German caricaturists
Artists from Dresden